Financial distress is a term in corporate finance used to indicate a condition when promises to creditors of a company are broken or honored with difficulty. If financial distress cannot be relieved, it can lead to bankruptcy. Financial distress is usually associated with some costs to the company; these are known as costs of financial distress.

Cost
A common example of a cost of financial distress is bankruptcy costs. These direct costs include auditors' fees, legal fees, management fees and other payments. Cost of financial distress can occur even if bankruptcy is avoided (indirect costs).

Financial distress in companies requires management attention and might lead to reduced attention on the operations of the company.

Another source of indirect costs of financial distress are higher costs of capital as usually banks increase the interest rates if a state of financial distress occurs.

Options for relieving financial distress
If high debt burden is the cause of financial distress, the company can undergo a debt restructuring. 
If operational issues are the reason for the distress, the company can negotiate a payment holiday with its creditors and improve operations to be able to service its debt.
See  for discussion.

External links
 Indicators and Sources of Financial Distress
 Predicting Financial Distress of Companies: Revisiting the Z-Score and Zeta Models by Edward Altman
 Financial Distress, Bankruptcy Law, and the Business Cycle by Javier Suarez and Oren Sussman
 Insolvency Service website
 Probability of bankruptcy screener for public companies based on Altman Z Score

Corporate finance
Bankruptcy
Insolvency